David S. Calloway is a former American football coach and former player. He previously coached  football at Central Methodist University in Fayette, Missouri, a position he had held since the 2016 season. Calloway served as the head football coach at Texas A&M University–Kingsville from 2013 to 2014.

Head coaching record

Notes

References

External links
 Central Methodist profile

Year of birth missing (living people)
Living people
Central Methodist Eagles football coaches
Hastings Broncos football coaches
Lane Dragons football coaches
Langston Lions football coaches
Langston Lions football players
Southeastern Oklahoma State Savage Storm football coaches
Texas A&M–Kingsville Javelinas football coaches
African-American coaches of American football
African-American players of American football
20th-century African-American sportspeople
21st-century African-American sportspeople